Sikandar or Sikander is a 1941 epic  Bollywood film directed by Sohrab Modi and starring Prithviraj Kapoor as Alexander the Great.

Development 

The battle sequences featuring thousands of extras along with horses, elephants and chariots were filmed in Kolhapur.

Plot 
The story is set in 326 B.C. The film begins after Alexander the Great (Sikander in Hindustani) conquers Persia and the Kabul valley and approaches the Indian border at Jhelum. He respects Aristotle and loves Persian Rukhsana (known in the west as Roxana). Sohrab Modi plays the Indian king Puru (Porus to the Greeks). Puru requests neighbouring kingdoms to unite against a common foreign enemy.

The story goes that when Sikander defeated Porus and imprisoned him, he asked Porus how would he like to be treated. Porus replied: "the same way a king is treated by another king". Sikander was impressed by his answer and set him free.

Cast

 Sohrab Modi as Porus
 Prithviraj as Alexander
 Vanmala as Rukhsana
 Meena Shorey as Parthana
 Sheela as Sukhman
 Sadiq Ali as Samar
 Shakir as Aristotle
 K. N. Singh as Raja Ambhi
 LalaYakub as Salencons
 Gagendra Singh as Enmanese
 Jillo bai as Sarita Rani
 Zahur Raja as Amar
 Abu bakar
 Ghulam Hussein
 Noor Jehan
 Prakash
 G. S. Shorry
 Athavale

Release 
The release of the film coincided with World War II and the quest for Swaraj or Quit India at its peak. In India, the political atmosphere was tense, following Gandhi's call to civil disobedience. Sikander further aroused patriotic feelings and nationalistic sentiment. Thus, though Sikander was approved by the Bombay censor board, it was later banned from some of the theatres serving British Indian Army cantonments.

However, its appeal to nationalism was so great and direct, it remained popular for years. It was revived in Delhi in 1961 during the Indian march into Goa. After the movie was a huge box office success, it was dubbed and released in Persian. The music of Sikandar was composed by Meer Sahib. A prominent song was "Zindagi Hai Pyar Se, Pyar Se Bitaye Ja".

Remake
It was remade in 1965 as Sikandar E Azam in color, by Kedar Kapoor, starring Prithviraj Kapoor, Dara Singh, Mumtaz, Madhumati, Helen, Prem Nath, Prem Chopra, Jeevan.

See also
List of historical drama films of Asia

References

External links

1940s Hindi-language films
1940s Urdu-language films
1941 films
Films about Alexander the Great
Indian black-and-white films
Films directed by Sohrab Modi
Classical war films
Indian war films
1941 war films
Indian historical films
1940s historical films
Urdu-language Indian films